Kausland is a village in Øygarden municipality in Vestland county, Norway. Kausland Church is located in this village, serving western Sund municipality.

References

Villages in Vestland
Øygarden